Crimetime is a 1996 British thriller film starring Stephen Baldwin, Pete Postlethwaite, Sadie Frost and directed by George Sluizer.

Plot
Crimetime is set in the future where the media is nearly omnipotent. When an unemployed actor named Bobby (Stephen Baldwin) is hired to play a serial killer on a crime reenactment television series he desires to understand the killer's motivations and begins researching the crimes getting police officers to describe the grisly details of recent murders. Bobby becomes an expert and a star, which delights the real culprit and inspires him to go on to even more lurid, headline-grabbing crimes.

Reception
Crimetime was released to negative critical reaction mainly noting the confusion of the plot. Shlomo Schwartzberg of Boxoffice magazine stated "Crime Time makes little sense at its best of times. At its worst, it's unwatchable." Channel 4 in their review noted that in spite of "a decent cast and the odd stylistic flourish, this psychodrama is dragged down by histrionic plotting, clunky talk and general sense of confusion over what it wants to be."

References

External links
 
 
 
 

1996 films
1990s psychological thriller films
British neo-noir films
British satirical films
Films directed by George Sluizer
Films about actors
Films set in the future
Trimark Pictures films
1990s English-language films
1990s British films